Yevgeniya Pavlovna Simonova (born 1 June 1955) is a Soviet and Russian theatre and film actress best known for her parts in films Afonya (1975), An Ordinary Miracle (1978), Twenty Six Days from the Life of Dostoyevsky (1981). In 1984 she received the State Prize for her contribution to several early 1980s Mayakovsky Theatre productions, including the Life of Klim Samgin (after Maxim Gorky's novel).

Selected filmography
Ten Winters During One Summer (Десять зим за одно лето, 1969) as Katya
Only "Old Men" Are Going Into Battle (В бой идут одни старики, 1973) as Masha
Flight Is Postponed (Вылет задерживается, 1974) as Elena Shemetova
Afonya (Афоня, 1975) as Katya Snegireva
The Lost Expedition (Пропавшая экспедиция, 1975) as Tasya Smelkova
Golden River (Золотая речка, 1976) as Tasya Smelkova
An Ordinary Miracle (Обыкновенное чудо, 1978) as Princess
School Waltz (Школьный вальс, 1978) as Dina Solovyova
Rafferty (Рафферти, 1980) as Jill Hart
Twenty Six Days from the Life of Dostoyevsky (Двадцать шесть дней из жизни Достоевского, 1981) as Anna Dostoyevskaya
The Raw Youth (Подросток) (1983) as Alphonsine
Quarantine (Карантин) (1983) as mother
Russian Ragtime (Русский регтайм, 1993) as Masha

References

External links

1955 births
Living people
Actresses from Saint Petersburg
Soviet film actresses
Russian film actresses
Soviet stage actresses
Russian stage actresses
20th-century Russian actresses
21st-century Russian actresses
Recipients of the USSR State Prize
Recipients of the Lenin Komsomol Prize
Recipients of the Order of Honour (Russia)
People's Artists of Russia
Recipients of the Nika Award
Academicians of the Russian Academy of Cinema Arts and Sciences "Nika"
Academicians of the National Academy of Motion Picture Arts and Sciences of Russia